The Ministry of Health of Armenia is a republican body of executive authority, which elaborates and implements the policies of the Government of Armenia in the healthcare sector.

Former Ministers 
 Mihran Nazaryan (1990-1991)
 Ara Babluyan (1991-1997)
 Gagik Stambultsyan (1997-1998)
 Hayk Nikoghusyan (1998-2000)
 Ararat Mkrtchyan (2000-2003)
 Norayr Davityan (2003-2007)
 Harutyun Kushkyan (2007-2012)
 Derenik Dumanyan (2012-2014)
 Armen Muradyan (2014-2016)
 Levon Altonyan (2016-2018)
 Arsen Torosyan (2018–January 2021)
Anahit Avanesian (January 2021 – present)

See also 
 Health in Armenia

References

External links 

 

Health
Armenia
Ministries established in 1918
1918 establishments in Armenia